= Marvin de Geest =

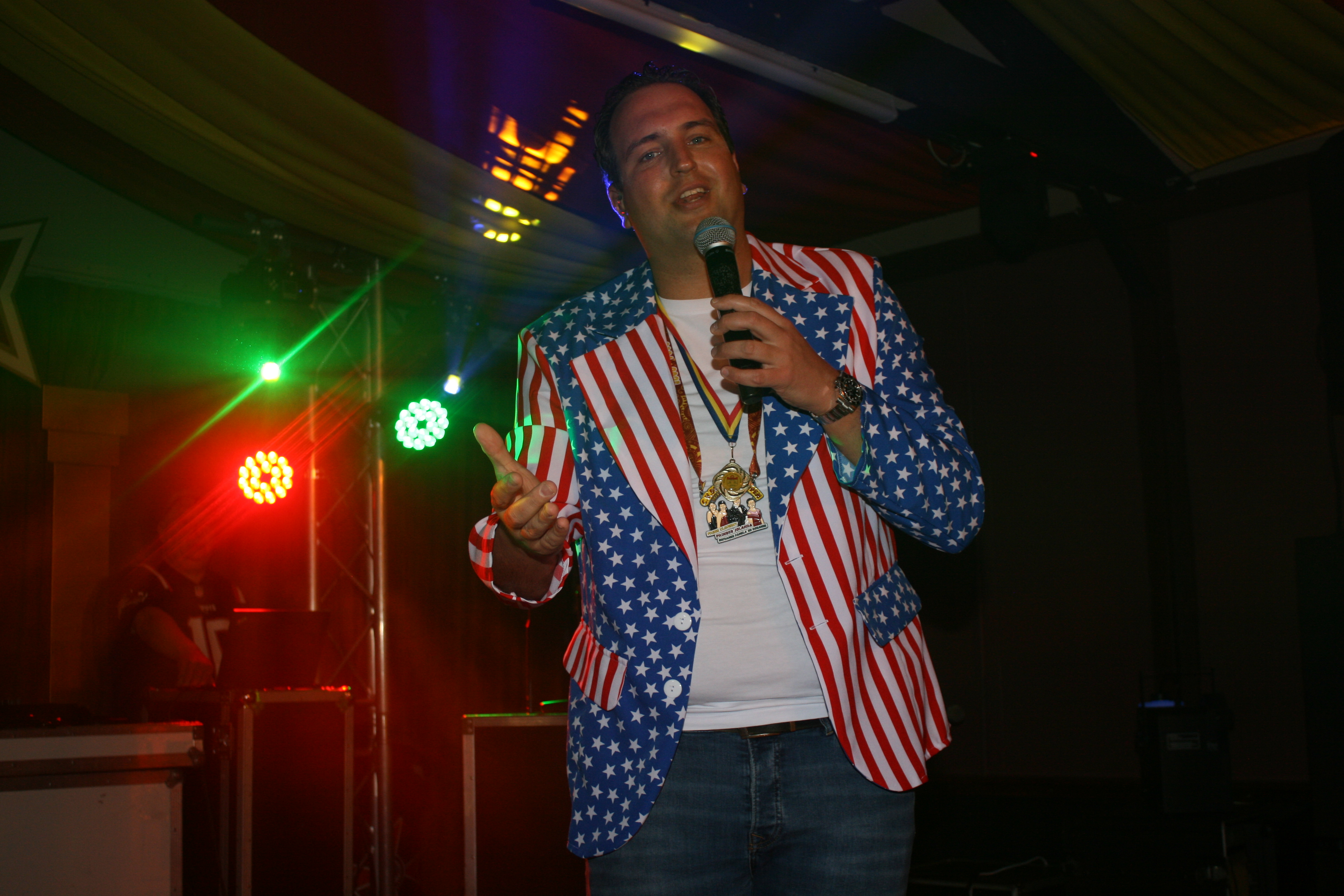

Background information
- Born: 15 September 1989 (age 37); Arnhem, The Netherlands
- Genre: Dutch folk
- Label: Cornelis Music

Marvin de Geest (Arnhem, 15 September 1989) is a Dutch singer active in the Dutch folk genre.

== Biography ==
Marvin de Geest started singing at the age of 17. After positive feedback from the audience he contacted well-known singer Frank van Etten. This resulted in the production of the first single of De Geest titled 'Ga maar door'. In 2020 he started cooperating with producer Manfred Jongenelis where this first single got an update in 2020.

In 2024 he releases a new single, again with Manfred Jongenelis. The single was named 'Dit gaat over jou'. The single came in the NPO Sterren NL top 25 for the first time in November 2024 at the 22nd place.

== Discography ==
=== Singles ===
Single	Release date	Charts	
Single	Release date	Sterren NL Top 25	
Single	Release date	Highest	Weeks
Ga maar door	17 maart 2010	-	-
Kleine kameraad	17 maart 2010	-	-
Liefdesverlangen	17 maart 2011	-	-
Ben Zo Verliefd Op Jou	3 April 2014	-	-
Wordt Jij Ooit Van Mij	17 maart 2016	-	-
Jij hoort in mijn leven	17 maart 2017	-	-
Als zij naar me kijkt	17 maart 2019	-	-
Fiësta accordeon	17 maart 2020	-	-
Ik weet niet wat je doet	17 maart 2020	-	-
Lieve kleine meid	20 maart 2020	-	-
Ga maar door (2021 versie)	8 oktober 2021	-	-
Jij past bij mij	3 juni 2022	-	-
Oh mia bella	4 augustus 2023	-	-
Stapelgek op jou	15 maart 2024	-	-
Dit gaat over jou	20 September 2024	20	3
